The nine-primaried oscines is a group of bird families in the suborder Passeri (oscines) of the Passeriformes. The composition of the group has changed since the term was introduced but is now considered to consist of seven major families—Fringillidae, Emberizidae, Cardinalidae, Thraupidae, Passerellidae, Parulidae and Icteridae—plus some small families. When Fringillidae is omitted the remaining six families are referred to as the "New World" nine-primaried oscines.

The name of this group arises from the fact that all species within it have only nine easily visible primary feathers on each wing (in reality most, if not all, also have a tenth primary, but it is greatly reduced and largely concealed).

Wallace's classification
In 1874 the British naturalist Alfred Russel Wallace classified the passerines by the number of primary feathers and placed ten families in his nine-primaried group, the Tanagroid Passeres:
 Motacillidae – wagtails and pipits
 Mniotiltidae – New World warblers, now in Parulidae
 Coerebidae – honeycreepers, now in Thraupidae
 Drepanidae – Hawaiian honeycreepers, later Drepanididae, now in Fringillidae
 Dicaeidae – flowerpeckers 
 Ampelidae – waxwings, now in Bombycillidae 
 Hirundinidae – swallows and martins
 Tanagridae – tanagers, now in Thraupidae, and euphonias, now in Fringillidae
 Fringillidae – finches, plus buntings, now in Emberizidae, and American sparrows, now in Passerellidae
 Icteridae – grackles, New World blackbirds and orioles

Modern grouping

Six of Wallace's families are now included in the nine-primaried oscines: Mniotiltidae, Coerebidae, Drepanidae, Tanagridae, Fringillidae and Icteridae. The other four families are now known to be less closely related.

Although the New World nine-primaried oscines are most diverse in northern South America, they are widespread throughout the New World including the Greater and Lesser Antilles. They have also colonised the Galápagos (Darwin's finches) and the Tristan da Cunha group in the South Atlantic (Nesospiza and Rowettia in Thraupidae).  Two families, the Emberizidae (buntings) and the Calcariidae (longspurs and snow buntings), have colonised the Old World.

The group without the Fringillidae, the New World nine-primaried oscines, is the superfamily Emberizoidea. The superfamily comprises some 870 species or 8% of all birds. It is divided into 16 families:

 Fringillidae – 228 species: finches and euphonias
 Rhodinocichlidae – rosy thrush-tanager
 Calcariidae – 6 species: longspurs and snow buntings
 Emberizidae – 44 species: buntings
 Cardinalidae – 53 species: cardinals
 Mitrospingidae – 4 species: mitrospingid tanagers
 Thraupidae – 383 species: tanagers and allies
 Passerellidae – 136 species: New World sparrows, bush tanagers
 Parulidae – 119 species: New World warblers
 Icteriidae – yellow-breasted chat
 Icteridae – 109 species: grackles, New World blackbirds, and New World orioles
 Calyptophilidae – 2 species: chat-tanagers
 Zeledoniidae – wrenthrush
 Teretistridae – 2 species: Cuban warblers
 Nesospingidae – Puerto Rican tanager
 Spindalidae – 4 species: spindalises
 Phaenicophilidae – 4 species: Hispaniolan tanagers

Notes

References

Passeroidea